The Southern Pacific GS-4 is a class of streamlined 4-8-4 "Northern" type steam locomotive operated by the Southern Pacific Railroad (SP) from 1941 to 1958.  A total of twenty-eight were built by the Lima Locomotive Works, numbered 4430 through 4457.  GS stands for "Golden State" or "General Service."

History
Unlike the GS-3, the GS-4 had a dual-headlight casing (the top headlight was a mars light) on the silver smokebox. Another change was the all-weather cab. It retained the skyline casing atop the boiler, skirting on the sides, an air horn to supplement the whistle, and teardrop classification lights. They carried the orange and red "Daylight" paint scheme.

Southern Pacific's premier passenger trains were pulled by GS-4s: the Coast Daylight, San Joaquin Daylight, Lark, Cascade, Golden State, and the Sunset Limited. During wartime and in the first years after the war, some of the GS-4 locomotives were painted black; by 1948 all had been repainted Daylight colors. Between 1947 and 1956 most were painted black again, had their side skirts removed for easier maintenance, and were reassigned to the San Jose-San Francisco Peninsula Commute service, freight service, and the occasional San Joaquin Daylight (steam locomotives remained on that train as late as 1956, which made it the last streamliner train to be pulled by steam on the Southern Pacific) until the were replaced by diesel locomotives. GS-4 No. 4443 pulled one of the final steam excursions on the Southern Pacific in 1957. A GS-4 pulled its last passenger train in October 1958, and they were all retired by the end of the year.

The tender of No. 4444 (the last GS-4 to be scrapped) was rebuilt by SP and used as a "hammer car" to test impacts on hydracushion boxcars; it was scrapped in the early 1970s.

Accident

 In the days of steam, Southern Pacific GS-4 No. 4446 had collided with the Lark in a siding at Donner Pass (the date of the accident is unknown)

Preservation
Southern Pacific 4449 is the only surviving GS-4 locomotive and is one of the most recognizable locomotives of all time. It was donated to the City of Portland in 1958 and moved to Oaks Amusement Park for static display, where it was repeatedly vandalized and had many of its external parts stolen (E.g: builder's plate and whistle) until December 1974 when the locomotive was removed from the park to undergo a restoration. From August 1975 to December 1976, No. 4449 shared duties with several other steam locomotives pulling the American Freedom Train (that train was pulled by Reading T-1 2101) throughout the U.S. No. 4449 is still operational and since mid-2012 resides at the Oregon Rail Heritage Center in Portland along with other preserved locomotives and rolling stock.

In Film

 No. 4449 appeared in the 1990 drama Come See the Paradise.
 No. 4449 was featured in the 1986 Burt Lancaster-Kirk Douglas action comedy Tough Guys as the Gold Coast Flyer. In the film, No. 4449 is hijacked and run off the end of the track across the Mexican border. A full-size wooden replica of the locomotive was used to shoot the crash scene.
 An unknown GS-4 appeared in the 1964 movie Dear Heart as the 20th Century Limited.
 GS-4 No. 4443 appeared in the opening credits of the 1957 Frank Sinatra film Pal Joey.
 Another GS-4 appeared as the main setting for the 1951 Alfred Hitchcock thriller Strangers on a Train.
 4449 has been fitted with an IMAX camera in 2018, to be filmed for the upcoming IMAX film Train Time.

References

External links
 Friends of SP 4449
 The Southern Pacific (i.e. "Espee") Golden State Locomotives Classes GS-1 to GS-6
 The Southern Pacific Technical and Historical Society
 The Museum of America's Freedom Trains
 Southern Pacific Coast Daylight Engines

GS-4
4-8-4 locomotives
Lima locomotives
Streamlined steam locomotives
Passenger locomotives
Railway locomotives introduced in 1941
Steam locomotives of the United States
Standard gauge locomotives of the United States